Goleta Valley Junior High School is a junior high school in Goleta, California, just northwest of Santa Barbara, California in the Goleta Valley. With a student body of about 785 students in grades 7th and 8th, Goleta Valley J.H. employs about fifty five teachers as part of the Santa Barbara School Districts. GVJH or simply GV is a National Blue Ribbon School.

Students
The students are known as Mariners. They are further divided into four houses (as is done commonly in the United Kingdom): Sea Monkeys, Golden Vikings, Pirates, and Buccaneers. The houses compete for House Points in traditional school spirit events. At the end of the year the house with the most points wins the "Miner Cup".

Electives

Seventh Graders
For 7th graders the school offers few choices. Classes include Industrial Technology, and either Art or Theater Art. If students choose too, they can audition for an advanced performing arts class or show choir, taken during the first semester. Students in the Beginning Band, Orchestra, or Show Choir do not rotate in the wheel. 

In addition to the wheel, students are given the options to take an Advanced Band class before school, and a Spanish 1-2 class after school.

Eighth Graders
For eighth graders GVJH offers more choices including:
Spanish
Industrial Technology
AVID
Art
Office Aide
Leadership
Performing Arts
Show Choir
Beginning Band
Advanced Band
Orchestra
Jazz Ensemble
Coding
French 1-2
Video Production

References

Schools in Santa Barbara County, California
Goleta, California
Public middle schools in California
1964 establishments in California